Alipur is a village located in Khanna tehsil, in the Ludhiana district of Punjab, India. The total population of the village is about 755.

References

  
Villages in Ludhiana district